Frederic Waller (1886 – May 18, 1954) was an American inventor and film pioneer.

Career
Waller is most known for his contributions to film special effects while working at Paramount Pictures, for his creation of the Waller Flexible Gunnery Trainer, and for inventing Cinerama, the immersive experience of a curved film screen that extends to the viewer's peripheral vision for which he received an Academy Award. Waller, a snow skiing and boating enthusiast, is also credited with obtaining the first patent for a water ski in 1925. He produced and directed 200 one-reel shorts for Paramount, including Cab Calloway's Hi-De-Ho and Duke Ellington's Symphony in Black. He patented several pieces of photographic equipment, including a camera that could take a 360-degree still photo. As the special projects director for the 1939 New York World's Fair, he collaborated on the fair centerpiece attraction called the Perisphere, the Eastman Kodak Hall of Color, and he developed the Time and Space Building to showcase his creation, Vitarama an 11-projector system projecting onto a half dome sphere and precursor to Cinerama. During World War II the Vitarama Corporation (and Fred Waller) produced a five projector aerial gunnery trainer used by the armed forces. It saved an estimated 350,000 casualties during the during the war.

Patents

 : Aquaplane (filed Aug 22, 1925, issued Oct 27, 1925)
 : Anemometer (filed Dec 29, 1936, issued Aug 2, 1938)
 : Apparatus for taking sounds (filed May 29, 1937, issued Jul 4, 1939)
 : Screen for picture projection (filed Jun 14, 1938, issued Feb 17, 1942)
 : Gunnery training apparatus (filed May 20, 1944, issued Jul 27, 1948)
 : Control band for gunnery training apparatus (filed May 20, 1944, issued May 17, 1949)
 : Electrically illuminated display apparatus (filed Jul 26, 1944, issued Nov 16, 1948)
 : Desiccator (filed Mar 8, 1946, issued Nov 8, 1949)
 : Apparatus for controlling picture displays from sound records (filed Feb 15, 1947, issued Apr 4, 1950)
 : Screen for picture projections (filed Sep 22, 1947, issued Jul 19, 1949)
 : Method of photographically correcting the photographic images of objects (filed Feb 4, 1948, issued Jan 5, 1954)
 : Parallax correction for multilens cameras (filed Oct 9, 1948, issued Jan 22, 1952)
 : Apparatus for holding and guiding a chain of slides for successive display (filed Nov 17, 1948, issued Aug 14, 1951)
 : Linked holder for lantern slides (filed Dec 4, 1948, issued Jul 6, 1954)
 : Photographic apparatus for correcting negatives during printing thereof (filed Sep 30, 1949, issued Jan 5, 1954)
 : Slide projector with sloping magazine and slide carrier for withdrawing the lowermost slide from the magazine (filed Feb 20, 1951, issued Apr 5, 1955)

Awards
 Society of Motion Picture & Television Engineers Progress Medal (1953)
 Academy of Motion Picture Arts and Sciences Scientific or Technical Award (1954)

References

Further reading

 Carey, Charles W. (1999) "American Inventors, Entrepreneurs, and Business Visionaries". Facts on File Library of American History .
 Koszarski, Richard. (2008) "Hollywood On the Hudson: Film and Television in New York from Griffith to Sarnoff". Rutgers University Press .

External links
 
 in70mm.com - Mr. Cinerama
 in70mm.com - Ladies and Gentlemen, this is Cinerama!

1886 births
1954 deaths
Polytechnic Institute of New York University alumni
20th-century American inventors
Recipients of the Scientific and Technical Academy Award of Merit
American water skiers
Sports inventors and innovators